The 2020 Central Vietnam floods were a series of floods in Central Vietnam, which also affected some areas in Cambodia and Laos in October and early November 2020. The floods focused heavily in several provinces including Thừa Thiên Huế, Hà Tĩnh, Quảng Bình, Quảng Trị, and Quảng Ngãi. The floods were mainly caused by the seasonal monsoon, though enhanced by numerous tropical cyclones.

This subsequent flooding was the first time Vietnam issued IV category disaster alert for heavy rainfall, as III category is the highest alert level.

On 5 November, the weakening Typhoon Goni entered the South China Sea and made landfall in Central Vietnam two days later as a tropical depression. Etau made landfall in Central Vietnam as a tropical storm three days later. On 12 November, Typhoon Vamco approached Vietnam as it gradually strengthened into Category 4-equivalent status after exiting the Philippine Area of Responsibility.

As of 1 December, over 243 people were reported by Vietnam Disaster Management Authority (VNDMA) as dead or missing due to the floods. The floods resulted in almost đ35.2 trillion (US$1.52 billion) of damages.

Impact

Seasonal monsoon associated with tropical depressions (6–9 October)
On 7 October, a tropical depression made landfall in the Khánh Hòa province. Enhanced by the seasonal northeast monsoon, many provinces nearby suffered heavy rainfall with average accumulations of 200–300 mm. By 11 October (before Linfa made landfall), heavy floods killed 9 people.

Tropical Storm Linfa

On 9 October, a tropical depression formed in east Luzon. It was upgraded to a tropical storm, named Linfa, on the next day. On 11 October, Linfa struck the central Vietnamese coast in the province of Quảng Ngãi, the area that was already flooded by previous seasonal monsoon events from 6–9 October. The storm destroyed a total of 382 houses and flooded 109,034 others. In addition, the storm damaged 165.1 km of national highways and 140.1 km of provincial highways. In total, the storm left 174 people dead and 20 missing in Vietnam and Cambodia.

Rào Trăng 3 landslides 
On the night of 11 October, heavy rainfall attributed from typhoon Linfa resulted in landslide at the Rào Trăng 3 Hydropower Plant in Phong Điền District of Thua Thien Hue province, leaving 17 construction workers missing. On 12 October 2020, a military rescue team sent to the missing workers was hit by another landslide, killing Major General Nguyễn Văn Man and 12 other soldiers. On 15 October 2020, their bodies were found by rescuers.

Tropical Storm Nangka

In preparation for Nangka, more than 150,000 people in Vietnam were evacuated from their homes. Some Vietnamese provinces banned vessels from heading out to sea during the storm. Vinh Airport in Nghe An Province and Tho Xuan Airport in Thanh Hoa Province were closed on 14 October. Vietnam Airlines and Pacific Airlines announced that eight flights were cancelled to the two airports.

On 11 October, a tropical depression formed in the west of Luzon. It was upgraded to a tropical storm, named Nangka, on the next day. On 13 October, Nangka crossed the Gulf of Tonkin, and it made landfall in Ninh Bình on the next day. The storm caused 2 deaths and 1 missing in Northern Vietnam.

Tropical Depression Ofel
Ofel made landfall after entering the South China Sea then dissipated in Central Vietnam on 16 October. 10 people were reported dead on 21 October, likely caused by Ofel's remnant and the northeast monsoon. By 20 October, rainfall had reduced significantly.

Hướng Hóa landslides 
On 18 October, a sudden landslide buried barracks of an army economic division in Hướng Phùng Commune, Hướng Hoá District of Quảng Trị province, killing 22 soldiers. Another landslide in Hướng Hóa District also killed 6 people in a family and one rescuer.

Tropical Storm Saudel

As Saudel approached Vietnam, it began to rapidly weaken due to high vertical wind shear and was downgraded to a tropical storm on 24 October 2020. The next day, it was downgraded to a remnant low as its center became mostly devoid of any deep convection. Although weakened, Saudel still brought heavy rainfall to Central Vietnam.

The storm also caused strong winds and rough seas over waters off the Malaysian state of Sabah where the Malaysian Meteorological Department (MetMalaysia) had issued a tropical storm advisory with the distance between the storm and nearest town is about 1,315 kilometers northwest of Kudat.

Typhoon Molave

Nearly 1.3 million people were evacuated in Vietnam, as Prime Minister Nguyen Xuan Phuc ordered boats onshore and advised preparations for the security force and residents in the area. The prime minister also compared Molave to Typhoon Damrey of 2017. Hundreds of flights were cancelled and schools were forced to close. The federal government mobilized about 250,000 troops and 2,300 vehicles to be used for search and rescue missions. Members of the Vietnamese military helped load elderly people onto evacuation buses and helped direct boats onshore. Some also helped residents put sandbags on their roof. On 27 October, Da Nang People's Committee had requested people to not leave their houses starting from 8:00 pm (local time) that night and urged all officials and workers to not come into work on the next day, among other measures in preparation for the typhoon.

On 27 October, the typhoon caused two Vietnamese fishing boats to sink. Authorities deployed search boats to search for 26 missing fishermen that were on the boats.

Molave started affecting Vietnam late on 27 October. On the morning of the 28th, the entire island of Lý Sơn and its 20,000 inhabitants lost power. The island was lashed with  winds for hours. Waves as high as  lashed coastal areas of Vietnam.

Molave caused widespread destruction in Central Vietnam. Molave brought heavy rains; Sơn Kỳ (Quảng Ngãi) received  of rainfall over 24 hours. The typhoon damaged or destroyed 56,163 houses and left 6.5 million people without power. It killed 13 people, injured 16, and left 48 others remaining missing. As of 1 November, Vietnam reported that approximately 10 trillion VND ($430 million) worth of damages were caused by Molave.

Quảng Nam landslides 
Devastating landslides caused by Molave have killed at least 28 people in the communes of Nam Trà My District of Quảng Nam province. Another landslide in Phuoc Son District buried 11 people in a same family.

Tropical Storm Goni

Goni first moved into the South China Sea after its catastrophic landfall in Catanduanes, with its intensity ranging from  before briefly weakening again into a  tropical depression. Goni's convection decoupled from its low-level circulation as a result of anticyclonic wind shear generated by the nearby Tropical Storm Atsani (Siony) from Northern Luzon combined with cooler water. Goni's trough then brought showers, thunderstorms, and more flooding to an already rain-stricken Vietnam from the previous Linfa, Nangka, Ofel, Saudel and Molave which had all struck a few days earlier. Goni brought unusual floods to coastal cities of Nha Trang and Quy Nhơn.

According to the National Center for Hydro-Meteorological Forecasting, the storm would hit Da Nang and Phu Yen provinces on 5 November. On 3 November, just two days before the expected landfall, the only preparations done were to institute a no-sail policy within the storm's path which affected about 50,000 fishing boats. The following day, Quang Ngai People's Committee Chairman Dang Van Minh asked those living in landslide-prone areas to evacuate, while the National Committee for Disaster Prevention and Search and Rescue mobilized more than 64,500 people and 1,718 vehicles for rescue operations.

On 5 November, Tropical Depression Goni made landfall in southern Bình Định Province, becoming the fifth tropical cyclone to strike the country in the previous 30 days. A man in Quảng Ngãi Province was swept away by floodwaters on 6 November. Another man went missing on 6 November after the ship he was captaining sunk. Twenty houses in Quảng Nam Province collapsed into a river and a school was damaged. Roads in several provinces were damaged by erosion and landslides, including parts of the Ho Chi Minh Highway.

Damage in Bình Định Province from both Goni and Etau were calculated to be ₫543 billion (US$23.5 million).

Tropical Storm Etau

Tropical Storm Etau became a tropical depression on 7 November at 12:00 UTC, and was later upgraded to a tropical storm. The storm continued its way towards Central Vietnam after crossing the Philippines.

Etau killed two people in Quảng Nam and Bình Định and damaged 31 houses when it made landfall in central Vietnam on 10 November. The storm also caused gusty winds which uprooted trees and ripped roofs of buildings, many of which were still recovering from the adverse impacts of Typhoon Molave and the weakened Tropical Storm Goni. In addition, power outages locally affected the city of Tuy Hòa.

Economic losses in Tuy An, Phú Yên were counted as 122 billion VND (US$5.26 million).

Typhoon Vamco

After crossing through the Philippines as a Category 2-equivalent typhoon, the storm gradually strengthened into Category 3 status as it exited from the Philippine Area of Responsibility at 01:30 UTC, 12 November.

On 14 November, at least 460,000 people were ordered to evacuate by the government. On the morning of that same day, all flights in 5 airports, including Da Nang, Chu Lai, Phu Bai, Dong Hoi and Vinh, were ordered to be suspended or delayed.

Vamco began affecting Central Vietnam around midnight ICT on 15 November. Strong winds downed many trees and damaged numerous homes the four provinces of Hà Tĩnh to Thừa Thiên Huế. In Thuận An, Thừa Thiên Huế, strong waves lashed docking fishing ships and civilian houses. In the city of Da Nang, storm surge destroyed many sea embankments, while washing rocks and debris onshore, and into streets. Power outages affected 411,252 customers in six central provinces. A person was killed in Thừa Thiên-Huế Province, and economic losses in Quảng Bình Province reached 450 billion đồng (US$19.4 million). As of 16 November, Vietnamese Authorities reported that 325,000 people were evacuated and five people were injured due to Vamco.

Floodings by province

Nghệ An
The flooding in Nghệ An killed two people. Damages in Nghệ An is about 3 trillion VND ($129.44 million).

Hà Tĩnh
From 16 to 19 October, some areas in Hà Tĩnh received heavy rainfall (from Tropical depression Ofel):  in Kỳ Thượng;  in Lake Kim Sơn. Flooding in Hà Tĩnh killed 6 people. Damages in Hà Tĩnh were estimated about 5.5 trillion VND ($237.47 million).

Quảng Bình
From 6 to 13 October, tropical cyclones dumped about 550–1,200 mm of rain in Quảng Bình. From 16 to 19 October, remnants of Ofel brought  of rain in Vạn Trạch. Flooding in Quảng Bình killed 19 people, flooded 95,000 houses and made 190,000 households lose power. Losses caused by floods and landslides in Quảng Bình was about 3,511 billion VND ($151.49 million).

Quảng Trị
From 10 to 19 October, remnants of Linfa and Ofel brought heavy rainfall to Quảng Trị. Hướng Linh district received  of precipitation in 13 days. Landslides hit a military barrack on 17 October, killed 22 soldiers. In total flood and landslides left 52 deaths and 2 missing, caused about 3,000 billion VND ($129.4 million) in damages. Quang Tri authorities have asked the central government to supply materials and rescue equipment, including two amphibious vehicles, 27 boats, rescue equipment and chemicals for disinfection.

Thừa Thiên Huế
In Thừa Thiên Huế, its mountainous districts received the heaviest amounts of rainfall in the region, mostly came from tropical storm Linfa. In three days, from 10 to 13 October, Linfa brought  in A Lưới;  in Lake Khe Ngang, broke the historical record (2,244 mm in October 1999).

In total, floods caused 31 deaths and approximate 2,000 billion VND ($86.29 million) in damages in Thừa Thiên Huế.

Da Nang
Floods in Da Nang killed three people.

Quảng Nam
Floods in Quảng Nam killed 13 people. The city of Hội An has been flooded after heavy rainfall occurred on 7–8 October caused by tropical low 91W. Total economic losses in Quảng Nam were about 11 trillion VND ($478 million).

Other regions
Floods and landslides due to 91W, Linfa and Ofel caused 6 deaths in Quảng Ngãi, Gia Lai, Đắk Lắk, Lâm Đồng and Kon Tum.

International aid
The Vietnamese government has granted VND500 billion ($21.52 million) to five provinces worst-hit by the floods for rescue and social welfare support.

 : On 17 October, the United States Agency for International Development (USAID) affirmed immediate assistance worth $200,000 to support efforts to respond to severe flooding in Vietnam and Cambodia.
 On 30 October, the United States Secretary of State Mike Pompeo announced that the United States government has provided Vietnam $2 million for the floods.
 : On 18 October, the United Nations, along with Save the Children Vietnam, pledged $100,000 to Vietnam.
 On 6 November, the United Nations, through its Central Emergency Response Fund (CERF), pledged $3 million to support people affected by storms and floods in Vietnam.
From 17 to 27 November 2020, the United Nations Children's Fund (UNICEF) supplied Vietnamese children with ready-to-use therapeutic foods (RUTFs) and water, sanitation, and hygiene (WASH) supplies. As of 27 November, UNICEF received $2.56 million in funding to support their response plan for the floods in Vietnam.
 : On 18 October, supplies from the Association for Southeast Asian Nations Coordinating Center for Humanitarian Assistance donated 1,000 shelter repair kits and 1,300 kitchen sets to Vietnam.
 : On 23 October, the South Korean government decided to provide $300,000 humanitarian aid package to Vietnam.
 : On 23 October, Chinese Red Cross has provided US$100,000 for Vietnamese to overcome the floods.
 : Taiwan donates $400,000 to Vietnam in aid to cope with the floods.
 : Australia provided AUD$100,000 (US$71,300) for flood relief for Vietnam.
 : Despite many challenges caused by the worsening COVID-19 pandemic in Malaysia, Vietnamese expats and associations in the country had raised a total of VNĐ600 million donations for Vietnam to help affected people, particularly poor households.
 Asian Development Bank: The Asian Development Bank gave $3 million for the flood.
 : The EU will provide €1.3 million ($1.52 million) for critical humanitarian assistance to families affected by severe flooding that wreaked havoc across central Vietnam.
 : The Government of Ireland has decided to provide initial grants of €260,000 (approximately $300,000) to address the immediate humanitarian needs of vulnerable communities in affected areas in Quang Binh and Quang Tri provinces. The funding is being channelled through Plan International Vietnam and Project RENEW.
 : The U.K. on Tuesday announced a contribution of £500,000 ($649,100) in aid to central Vietnam, swept by the worst flooding of the past two decades.
 : On November 10, the Swiss government has sent an immediate relief aid of CHF300,000 ($328,803) to support central Vietnamese after the historical flood.
 : The Netherlands has pledged EUR2 million ($2.35 million) for providing immediate relief to people affected by last month's multiple storms and floods in central Vietnam.
 : In Argentina, the Embassy of Vietnam in Buenos Aires held an event on November 7 to call for donations for the flood victims from its staff as well those working for Vietnamese representative offices and their family.
 The Asian Development Bank (ADB): on 24 November, Vietnam's agriculture ministry and Asian Development Bank signed an agreement for an $2.5 million emergency grant for natural disaster relief.
 : Indian Navy corvette INS Kiltan (P30) arrived at the Nha Rong port of Ho Chi Minh City in December 2020 carrying 15 tonnes of humanitarian relief supplies for people affected by floods.

See also 
 2019 Vietnam floods
 2013 Southeast Asian floods
 2020 Pacific typhoon season

References

External links 
 Vietnam National Committee on Incident Response, Disaster Response, and Victim Search

2020 disasters in Vietnam
2020 Central
October 2020 events in Vietnam
2020 in Laos
Floods in Laos
2020 in Cambodia
Floods in Cambodia
2020 floods in Asia